Gluskin Sheff + Associates Inc. is a Canadian independent wealth management firm that manages investment portfolios for investors, including entrepreneurs, professionals, family trusts, private charitable foundations and estates. The company was founded in 1984 by Ira Gluskin and Gerald Sheff. The company went public in 2006, listing on the Toronto Stock Exchange (TSX) under the symbol "GS". It was subsequently purchased and privatized by Onex Corporation for $445 million in March 2019.

References

External links
Katie Benner, "Recovery: A long bearish road ahead" CNNMoney.com, February 18, 2010.
Lawrence C. Strauss, "A Vote for Bonds Over U.S. Stocks" Barron’s, September 14, 2009.

Companies formerly listed on the Toronto Stock Exchange
Investment management companies of Canada
2019 mergers and acquisitions